Michael Victor Shaw 3 February 1901–1976) was an English footballer who played in the Football League for Barnsley and Crewe Alexandra.

References

1901 births
1976 deaths
English footballers
Association football forwards
English Football League players
Barnsley F.C. players
Crewe Alexandra F.C. players
Chester F.C. players